2009 Empress's Cup Final was the 31st final of the Empress's Cup competition. The final was played at National Stadium in Tokyo on January 1, 2010. Nippon TV Beleza won the championship.

Overview
Defending champion Nippon TV Beleza won their 10th title, by defeating Urawa Reds 2–0 with Shinobu Ono and Homare Sawa goal. Nippon TV Beleza won the title for 3 years in a row.

Match details

See also
2009 Empress's Cup

References

Empress's Cup
2009 in Japanese women's football